South Hill is a civil parish and hamlet in east Cornwall, England, United Kingdom. The parish population at the 2011 census was 489.

The parish church was consecrated in 1333 and apart from the upper stage of the tower and the south aisle is entirely of this date (the additions are 15th century). The font is Norman and a fine example of the Bodmin type (carved with four faces, trees and curious creatures); in the churchyard is an inscribed stone of the 6th or 7th century. The tower is topped by figures of the Twelve Apostles. Callington was formerly in the parish of South Hill. St Sampson's well is supposed to have been either near the church in the grounds of the former rectory, or in a nearby valley in a stream leading to the river Lynher.

Notable people
George Symons VC DCM, artillery officer

References

External links

 South Hill Parish information

Hamlets in Cornwall
Civil parishes in Cornwall